This is a list of works by the 15th century Flemish composer Alexander Agricola.

Masses and mass sections
All are for 4 voices unless stated otherwise.

Masses
 Missa Le serviteur (based on Du Fay's chanson)
 Missa Malheur me bat (based on a chanson attributed to Malcourt, Martini and Ockeghem)
 Missa Je ne demande (based on Busnoys' chanson)
 Missa in Myne zyn (based on his on chanson and the monophonic tune)
 Missa Paschalis (based on the German chants for Kyrie I, Gloria I, Sanctus XVII and Agnus Dei XXII)
 Missa primi toni
 Missa secundi toni
 Missa sine nomine

Mass sections
 Credo Je ne vis oncques I (based on a chanson attributed to Du Fay and Binchois)
 Credo Je ne vis oncques II (based on a chanson attributed to Du Fay and Binchois)
 Credo Vilayge
 Credo—Sanctus Sine nomine (3vv)

Motets
All are for 4 voices unless stated otherwise.

Hymns, Lamentations and Magnificats
 A solis ortus cardine
 Ave maris stella
 Lamentations (3vv)
 Lamentations
 Magnificat primi toni
 Magnificat secundi toni
 Magnificat octavi toni

Motets on other text
 Arce sedet Bacchus (2vv)
 Ave domina sancta Maria
 Ave pulcherrima regina
 Da pacem, (3vv)
 Ergo sancti martyres
 Nobis Sancte Spiritus
 O crux ave
 O quam glorifica (3vv)
 O virens virginum
 Regina coeli
 Salve regina I
 Salve regina II
 Si dedero, (3vv)
 Transit Anna timor

Songs and other secular works
All are for 3 voices unless stated otherwise.

Motet-Chansons
 Belle sur toutes/Tota pulchra es
 L'heure est venue/Circumdederunt me
 Revenez tous regretz/Quis det ut veniat (4vv)

Vocal works
 Adieu m'amour
 Adieu m'amour
 A la mignonne de Fortune
 Allez mon cueur
 Allez, regretz
 Amor che sospirar
 Ay je rien fet
 C'est mal cherché
 C'est trop sur
 C'est ung bon bruit
 Crions nouel
 D … (text lost)
 Dictes moy toutes
 Donne, noi siam dell'olio facitori (3vv?, fragmentary)
 En actendant
 En dispitant
 En m'en venant
 Et qui la dira
 Fortuna desperata (6vv)
 Gentil galans
 Guarde vostre visage
 Il me fauldra maudire
 Il n'est vivant
 In minen zin
 J'ay beau huer
 Je n'ay dueil (4vv)
 Je ne puis plus
 Je ne suis point
 Mauldicte soit
 Mijn alderliefste moeschkin
 Oublier veul
 Par ung jour de matinee
 Pour voz plaisirs
 Princesse de toute beaulté
 Royne des flours
 Se je fais bien
 Se je vous eslonge
 Se mieulx ne vient d'amours
 Serviteur soye
 Sei congé prens
 S'il vous plaist
 Si vous voullez
 Soit loing
 Sonnés muses melodieusement
 Va t'en, regret
 Vostre bouche dist
 Vostre hault bruit

Instrumental works

 Amours, amours
 Cecus non-judicat de coloribus
 Comme femme (4vv)
 Comme femme
 Comme femme (2vv)
 De tous biens plaine (4vv)
 De tous biens plaine
 De tous biens plaine
 De tous biens plaine
 De tous biens plaine
 D'ung aultre amer (4vv)
 D'ung aultre amer (4vv)
 D'ung aultre amer
 D'ung aultre amer
 [Duo], (2vv)
 Gaudeamus omnes (2vv)
 Jam fulsit (4vv)
 L'homme banni
 O Venus bant
 O Venus bant
 Pater meus agricola est
 Pourquoy tant/Pour quelque paine
 Tandernaken
 Tout a par moy (4vv)
 Tout a par moy

References 
  
 

Agricola,compositions